Go West Midlands was a bus company in the West Midlands. It was a subsidiary of the Go-Ahead Group in March 2006.

History
On 2 December 2005, the Go-Ahead Group purchased Diamond Bus and in February 2006 Probus Management (trading as People's Express) with over 100 vehicles and merged the two companies to form Go West Midlands.

In 2006, Diamond relaunched its image, by increasing its frequency on route 16, which basically matched that of Travel West Midlands and increased its frequencies on routes 17, 63, 64, 74 and 87.

However, in November 2007, Diamond withdrew its services on routes 17 and 63 and majorly altered its operations on routes 74 and 87 (cutting parts of the route off completely).

Diamond also lost many Centro and Staffordshire County Council contracts to other operators.

In March 2008, Go West Midlands was sold to Rotala and rebranded as Diamond Bus.

Fleet
As at March 2007, Go West Midlands operated a fleet of over 130 buses.

References

Go-Ahead Group companies
Transport in Birmingham, West Midlands
Transport in Wolverhampton
2005 establishments in England
2008 disestablishments in England
British companies established in 2005
British companies disestablished in 2008
Former bus operators in the West Midlands (county)
Former bus operators in Staffordshire